A Life Less Ordinary is a 1997 romantic black comedy film directed by Danny Boyle, written by John Hodge, and starring Ewan McGregor, Cameron Diaz, Holly Hunter, Delroy Lindo, Ian Holm and Dan Hedaya. The plot follows two angels (Hunter and Lindo) who are sent to Earth to help make a disgruntled kidnapper (McGregor) and his hostage (Diaz) fall in love.

The film received mixed reviews and was unsuccessful at the box office, only grossing $14.6 million worldwide against its $12 million budget.

Plot
In Heaven, angels are tasked with ensuring that mortals on Earth find love. The "Captain", Gabriel, is upset at reviewing the file of angel partners O'Reilly and Jackson, all of whose recent cases have ended in divorce or misery. He introduces a radical new incentive: if their latest case isn't "cracked" – meaning, if the pair in question do not fall, and stay, in love, O'Reilly and Jackson must stay on earth forever, which does not appeal to them.

Celine Naville is the spoiled twenty-something daughter of a wealthy businessman. When one of her suitors, a loathsome dentist named Elliott, proposes marriage to her, she offers to say yes, but only if he agrees to reenact "William Tell" with an apple on his head. As she takes aim with a pistol, Elliot's nerves fail.

Robert Lewis is a janitor employed in the basement of Celine's father's company. His manager tells him he is to be replaced by a robot. As he drowns his sorrows at a local bar, his girlfriend, Lily tells him she is leaving him for an aerobics instructor.

O'Reilly and Jackson pose as collection agents to repossess Robert's things and evict him from his apartment. Robert storms to the office of Mr Naville. Security guards run in and start to attack Robert but he holds them off. When Celine introduces herself, Robert decides to kidnap her. He drives her to a remote cabin in the California woods. Celine easily slips free but decides to stick around. She stays for the adventure and revenge against her father, suggesting that they extort a huge ransom.

O'Reilly and Jackson pose as bounty hunters, and contract with Naville to retrieve Celine and kill Robert. Robert's first attempt to collect the ransom fails but Celine encourages him. They go out to a bar. When Robert wakes up the next morning, he is stunned to see that he and Celine have slept together.

Robert makes a second demand for the ransom, with a letter written in Celine's blood. Naville gives O'Reilly and Jackson the money, and they go to meet Robert in the forest. To their disappointment, Robert appears willing to let Celine go in exchange for the money before O'Reilly stops his getaway.

While O'Reilly and Celine wait by their car, Jackson takes Robert into the woods to execute him. Before he can, Celine decks O'Reilly, runs into the woods, and knocks Jackson out with a shovel. As Robert and Celine drive away, O'Reilly grabs the towbar and rides along. As she points her gun, Robert and Celine jump from the car, and it careens off a cliff, with the money still inside.

Since they are short of money, Celine decides to rob a bank with Jackson's pistol. The robbery goes smoothly, until a security guard shoots at Celine. Robert pushes her out of the way, taking a bullet in the thigh. Celine hurriedly drives him back to the city, to be operated on by Elliot. A little later, when Robert regains consciousness, he is appalled to see Celine playing a sleazy sexual role-playing game with Elliott. A fight breaks out, and Robert knocks Elliot unconscious. As they drive away, Celine explains that she only agreed to Elliot's request so that he would help Robert. Hurt, Robert gets out of the car and walks away.

To get them back together, Jackson writes a love poem in Robert's handwriting and sends it to Celine. Overcome, she runs back to the bar, where Robert has started working as a janitor, and says he has won her heart with the poem. O'Reilly and Jackson, listening, dance for joy... until Robert says that he's never written a poem in his life. Humiliated, Celine runs out again. Robert runs after Celine, but is too late: O'Reilly and Jackson, believing they have failed, decide to make their Earth-bound lives bearable by kidnapping Celine for ransom.

Robert tracks Celine to their hideout. He knocks O'Reilly down and, struggling with Jackson, tells Celine he loves her. The door is kicked down by Naville's butler, Mayhew, who shoots the two angels in the head. Leaving Celine locked in the trunk, Naville and Mayhew drive Robert and the two angels' bodies to the cabin, planning to fake a murder-suicide.

In Heaven, Gabriel's secretary begs him to intervene, but he refuses. He phones God and asks him to do so. A neighbour releases Celine from the truck. Taking his gun, she runs to the cabin and confronts her father, while Mayhew holds Robert at gunpoint. Celine shoots Mayhew in the shoulder.

Gabriel frees O'Reilly and Jackson from a pair of body bags. After Gabriel congratulates them on a successful case, the two angels embrace as they prepare to return home. Robert and Celine retrieve the suitcase full of money and settle in their new castle in Scotland.

Cast
Ewan McGregor as Robert Lewis
Cameron Diaz as Celine Naville
Holly Hunter as O'Reilly
Delroy Lindo as Jackson
Ian Holm as Naville
Dan Hedaya as Gabriel
Stanley Tucci as Elliot Zweikel
Maury Chaykin as Tod Johnson
Tony Shalhoub as Al
K.K. Dodds as Lily
Ian McNeice as Mayhew
Christopher Gorham as Walt
Timothy Olyphant as Hiker

Production 
Most of the film was shot in Utah, which was chosen for its diverse locations. The scenes at the Naville mansion were filmed in Malibu, California.

Reception

Critical response 

A Life Less Ordinary has received mixed reviews from film critics. Rotten Tomatoes gives the film a score of 41% based on 37 reviews, with an average score of 5.38/10. The sites critical consensus states "A Life Less Ordinary has an intriguing cast and stylish work from director Danny Boyle, but they're not enough to overcome the story's fatally misjudged tonal mishmash." Metacritic, which assigns a weighted average score in the 0–100 range based on reviews from mainstream critics, calculated an average score of 35% for the film, based on reviews from 22 critics. Andrew Johnson wrote in Time Out New York, "The outsiders' take on America that Boyle and screenwriter John Hodge bring to the film adds to its humour, as do subtle homages to other movies (including The Road Warrior, Reservoir Dogs and Raiders of the Lost Ark). Parts of Life lean toward the saccharine, and the ending could be stronger, but none of that prevents it from being one of the years' most charming date movies."

Roger Ebert gave A Life Less Ordinary a negative review, presenting it 2 out of 4 stars. He described the film as a "movie that never convinces us that it needed to be made." He goes on to call the plot a mess and states that it "expends enormous energy to tell a story that is tedious and contrived."

Box-office performance
The film opened up in theatres on 24 October 1997. During its opening weekend, the film ranked 9th overall by pulling in only $2,007,279. By the end of its run, the film grossed a total of $4,366,722 in the United States. Internationally, the film made $10,345,675 for a worldwide total of $14,633,270.

Adaptations
The film was serialised as a full-length comic strip within leading British comic 2000 AD, adapted by then-editor David Bishop and drawn by Steve Yeowell. Screenwriter John Hodge also wrote a novelisation of the film that was published by Penguin Books.

Scenes from the film were used in the music video for Beck's song "Deadweight", directed by Michel Gondry, and the music video for Ash's song "A Life Less Ordinary", directed by Hammer & Tongs, as well as the song "Don't Leave" by Faithless.

Soundtrack 

"Deadweight", a single by Beck, was nominated for Best Song from a Movie at the 1998 MTV Movie Awards.

See also
 List of films about angels

References

External links 
 
 
 A Life Less Ordinary at Metacritic
 

1997 films
1990s romantic fantasy films
1997 romantic comedy films
American romantic comedy films
British romantic comedy films
British romantic fantasy films
Film4 Productions films
Films about kidnapping
Films about angels
Films adapted into comics
Films directed by Danny Boyle
Films scored by David Arnold
Films shot in Salt Lake City
Films shot in Utah
American romantic fantasy films
Films with screenplays by John Hodge
20th Century Fox films
1990s English-language films
1990s American films
1990s British films